Diascia barberae, called twinspur along with other members of its genus, is a species of flowering plant in the family Scrophulariaceae, native to South Africa and Lesotho. Its cultivar 'Blackthorn Apricot' has gained the Royal Horticultural Society's Award of Garden Merit. Many other cultivars that vary largely by the color of their flowers are available, including 'Ruby Field', 'Lilac Belle' and 'Rupert Lambert'.

References

Scrophulariaceae
Garden plants of Africa
Flora of the Free State
Flora of KwaZulu-Natal
Flora of Lesotho
Plants described in 1871